The  was a Japanese coin worth one one-thousandth of a Japanese yen, as 10 rin equalled 1 sen, and 100 sen equaled 1 yen. While not in circulation any more, one rin coins are bought and sold by numismatists for academic study, and by those with a hobby.

History
One rin coins were first minted in 1873 shortly after Japan adopted a new currency system under the Meiji Restoration. These coins were approximately equal to a one mon coin of the old currency system. Meanwhile in the new yen based currency system the rin was the lowest denomination coin valued at one-one thousandth of a yen. All one rin coins are made from a bronze alloy, and are five-eights of an inch (15.75mm) in diameter with a weight of fifteen grains (0.9g). Production of one rin coins slowed by the middle of 1875, it was noted by the commissioner of the Imperial Mint that "there has been no lack of work in the department, on account for demand of copper coins, the whole of the coining-presses, excepting those for rin, having been daily in full operation". No coins were minted from 1878 to 1881 with the exception of 810 listed pieces being struck in 1880 for regular circulation. While coinage resumed in 1882 it was short lived as the rin was last minted for circulation in 1884. Factors for the one rin coin's demise included inconvenience due to their small size. 

One rin coins were later struck in 1892 (year 25) to have non circulating examples to display at the World's Columbian Exposition. All one rin coins were eventually taken out of circulation at the end of 1953 and demonetized. The Japanese government passed a new law during this time that abolished subsidiary coinage in favor of the yen.

Circulation figures

Meiji

The following are circulation figures for the one rin coin, all of which were minted between the 6th, and 25th year of Meiji's reign. The dates all begin with the Japanese symbol 明治 (Meiji), followed by the year of his reign the coin was minted. Each coin is read clockwise from right to left, so in the example used below "七十" would read as "year 17" or 1884.

"Year" ← "Number representing year of reign" ← "Emperors name" (Ex: 年 ← 七十 ← 治明)

Collecting
Common dates for the one rin coin can usually be found online, and at pawn shops where prices vary depending on the condition of the coin. Outside of these dates are four rarities which sell for much larger amounts due to their low mintages. The first two are coins dated 1876, and 1877 (year 9 and 10) which were released as regular issues as they were intended for circulation. An example of a coin dated 1876 (year 9) brought $12,075.00 (USD) at auction in 2011. While the following date 1877 (year 10) is also considered to be "very rare", it sold for a lower amount. The last two rarities dated 1880 (year 13) and 1892 (year 25) were not intended for circulation as they were specially made as presentation pieces. One rin coins dated 1880 (year 13) have a recorded mintage of just 810 pieces, but the actual amount struck is thought to be less. One example in AU58 condition sold for $12,650.00 (USD) at auction in 2011. Coins dated 1892 (year 25) were used for display in Chicago at the World's Columbian Exposition, and a unique piece sold for $63,250.00 (USD) in 2011. Certification by a coin grading service is recommended for one rin coins, as their simplistic design has made them a target of counterfeiters.

Notes

References

Coins of Japan
Japanese sen
One-base-unit coins